Perciformes, also called the Percomorpha or Acanthopteri, is an order or superorder of ray-finned fish. If considered a single order, they are the most numerous order of vertebrates, containing about 41% of all bony fish. Perciformes means "perch-like". Perciformes is an order within the Clade Percomorpha consisting of "perch-like" Percomorphans. This group comprises over 10,000 species found in almost all aquatic ecosystems.

The order contains about 160 families, which is the most of any order within the vertebrates. It is also the most variably sized order of vertebrates, ranging from the  Schindleria brevipinguis to the  marlin in the genus Makaira. They first appeared and diversified in the Late Cretaceous.

Among the well-known members of this group are perch and darters (Percidae), sea bass and groupers (Serranidae).

Characteristics

The dorsal and anal fins are divided into anterior spiny and posterior soft-rayed portions, which may be partially or completely separated. The pelvic fins usually have one spine and up to five soft rays, positioned unusually far forward under the chin or under the belly. Scales are usually ctenoid (rough to the touch), although sometimes they are cycloid (smooth to the touch) or otherwise modified.

Taxonomy
Classification of this group is controversial. As traditionally defined before the introduction of cladistics, the Perciformes are almost certainly paraphyletic. Other orders that should possibly be included as suborders are the Scorpaeniformes, Tetraodontiformes, and Pleuronectiformes.
Of the presently recognized suborders, several may be paraphyletic, as well. These are grouped by suborder/superfamily, generally following the text Fishes of the World.

References

 
Extant Late Cretaceous first appearances
Ray-finned fish orders
Taxa named by Pieter Bleeker